Aslanbek Chermenovich Sikoyev (born 11 March 1995) is a Russian professional footballer who plays as a forward.

Club career
He made his debut in the Russian Professional Football League for FC Vityaz Podolsk on 24 April 2015 in a game against FC Tambov.

He made his debut in the Russian Premier League for FC Arsenal Tula on 18 July 2017 in a game against FC Lokomotiv Moscow.

Career statistics

Club

References

External links
 Profile by Russian Professional Football League
 
 
 Profile at Crimean Football Union

1995 births
Living people
Ossetian people
Sportspeople from Vladikavkaz
Association football midfielders
Russian footballers
FC Rubin Kazan players
FC Vityaz Podolsk players
FC Spartak Vladikavkaz players
FC Arsenal Tula players
FC Dnyapro Mogilev players
FC Shinnik Yaroslavl players
FC Krymteplytsia Molodizhne players
FC Zhetysu players
FC KAMAZ Naberezhnye Chelny players
Russian Second League players
Russian Premier League players
Russian First League players
Crimean Premier League players
Kazakhstan First Division players
Russian expatriate footballers
Expatriate footballers in Belarus
Russian expatriate sportspeople in Belarus
Expatriate footballers in Kazakhstan
Russian expatriate sportspeople in Kazakhstan